The discography of Mexican recording artist Thalía, consists of 18 studio albums, 24 compilation albums, two live albums and 70 singles. She has also sung in Portuguese, French and Tagalog, apart from Spanish and English, in order to promote her music in other music markets. Thalía's popularity was further enhanced by her telenovelas, that were broadcast in over 180 countries, giving her the chance to create a solid fan base in many countries and gain stardom mainly by Spanish recording records. Her records have sold in markets that Latin stars don't normally sell such as China, Yemen, and the Philippines.

Her self-titled debut album Thalía, was released in 1990 by Fonovisa Records. With the same label she released two more albums; Mundo De Cristal in 1991 and Love in 1992, which had generally positive commercial success in Mexico and some countries in Latin America, the latter became her best-selling album under Fonovisa with 500,000 copies sold in Mexico alone.

In 1994, she moved to EMI Music and released her fourth studio album En Éxtasis the following year. It became a commercial success in over 25 countries around the world. Her next studio album, Amor A La Mexicana (1997) was even more successful than its predecessor, since Thalía had already become very popular with her music. At the same time, she released her first multilingual and first compilation album entitled Nandito Ako, which became a success in the Philippines and attained sales of 40,000 copies (Platinum) in its first-week there.

During the 2000s, she released more albums, including USA-Latin multiplatinum albums Arrasando in 2000, Thalía in 2002 and El Sexto Sentido in 2005 and also attained multiple music certifications around the world. In 2008, she released her tenth studio album, Lunada, which was considered to be her lowest-selling album at that time with 250,000 copies sold worldwide. However, she regained her commercial performance in 2009 when she joined Sony Music and released her first live album, Primera Fila, which sold over 1,5 million copies worldwide. As of 2013, it remained in the Mexican charts for over 170 weeks, according to AMPROFON, and spent 55 non-consecutive weeks at the top of the chart. During the 2010s, Thalía released more albums, including Habítame Siempre (2012), Amore Mío (2014), Latina (2016), and Valiente (2018). All of them reached gold or platinum status in Mexico.

In 2006 she received an award by her then record company EMI, for sales of more than 10 million copies with all her discography with the company (total of 15 million by 2005). By 2008, she sold 1,374,000 in United States, according to Nielsen SoundScan. Thalía has sold over 25 million records worldwide, being considered one of the best-selling Latin musicians of all time. She is also the biggest selling female Mexican soloist in Brazil and have at least one album among the best selling of all-time in Mexico, Chile and the Philippines. 

She has four number one in the Billboard Hot Latin Tracks and is among the female artists with most number one in that chart. Her biggest singles includes "Piel Morena", "Amor A La Mexicana", "Entre El Mar Y Una Estrella", "Arrasando", "Tú Y Yo", "No Me Enseñaste", "Cerca De Ti", "Desde Esa Noche" and "No Me Acuerdo". Some of them are consider one of the most representative songs in Latin pop music genre. "No Me Acuerdo" is also one of the best-selling Latin singles in the United States and was certified with 14× Platinum (Latin).

Albums

Studio albums

Live albums

Compilation albums

Limited releases

Extended plays

Singles

As lead artist

1990s

2000s

2010s

2020s

As featured artist

Promotional singles

Other appearances

Music videos

¹Some music videos were made for special TV (or other) appearances

Video albums

Music Video Compilations

 Greatest Hits Videos (2004)

Concert DVDs
 Primera Fila (2009) 
 Habítame Siempre (2012)
 Viva Tour (En Vivo) (2013)

Box sets
 La Historia (2010)

See also 
 List of best-selling albums in Mexico
 List of best-selling albums in Chile
 List of best-selling albums in the Philippines
 List of best-selling Latin albums
 List of best-selling Latin music artists

Notes

References

Discography
Latin pop music discographies
Discographies of Mexican artists